Global Estonian Cultural Days (abbreviated ECD; , abbreviated ESTO) is Estonian culture-related events held, in general, in every four year.

First ECD were held in Toronto, Canada in 1972. In this time Estonia was not an independent country but a part of Soviet Union (Estonian SSR).

Before Estonian Restoration of Independence in 1991, ECD were important events to keep Estonian culture alive.

Events
I ECD (Toronto 1972)
II ECD (Baltimore 1976)
III ECD (Stockholm 1980)
IV ECD (Toronto 1984)
V ECD (Melbourne 1988)
VI ECD (New York City 1992)
VII ECD (Stockholm and Tallinn 1996)
VIII ECD (Toronto 2000)
IX ECD (Riga 2004)
X ECD (Münster 2009)
XI ECD (San Francisco 2013)
XII ECD (Helsinki, Tartu and Tallinn 2019)

References

Estonian culture
Estonian culture abroad